Massachusetts Bay Trading Co, Inc., is an online retailer headquartered in Weston, Massachusetts, selling products worldwide. It is an American electronic commerce company selling handmade gifts and general products that are made in Massachusetts. The company was established in 2002. The Massachusetts Bay Trading Company has been featured in multiple publications and television segments including the Boston Globe on April 6, 2007, Opray Winfrey's O at Home magazine Winter 2006, Gourmet Magazine Winter 2006 gift guide, InStyle Magazine Fall 2007, and NECN.

Products
The store offers handmade home furnishings, clothing, jewelry, clocks, soaps, porcelain, and Boston artwork. Some of the unique items carried by MBTC include Spencer Peterman wooden spaulted bowls made from fallen trees replete with characteristic patterns formed by fungus inside the wood; Nantucket Lightship Baskets and hand-blown Limaj glass bowls; and handmade handbags made out of denim blue jeans.

Business model
Massachusetts Bay Trading Co is an online E-commerce retailer, through which Internet users purchase merchandise crafted by artists and companies located in Massachusetts. Massachusetts Bay Trading Co was founded on Patriots' Day 2002. 

The company has partnerships with Massachusetts arts societies including the Massachusetts Foundation for the Humanities to promote Massachusetts arts and cultural activities.

Massachusetts Bay Trading Co provides an artist gallery of craftsmen and companies producing crafts and products in Massachusetts.

Name
The name draws from the Massachusetts Bay Company, the institution that founded the Massachusetts Bay Colony in Boston in 1628. The Massachusetts Bay Company was one of the first companies to carry their charter with them to America thereby enabling them to govern themselves locally.

External links
Official site

Online retailers of the United States
Retail companies established in 2002
Retail companies based in Massachusetts
2002 establishments in Massachusetts
American companies established in 2002